Diospyros hallieri is a tree in the family Ebenaceae. Twigs are reddish brown when young. Inflorescences bear up to 10 flowers. The tree is named for the German botanist J. G. Hallier. Habitat is lowland mixed dipterocarp forests. D. hallieri is endemic to Borneo.

References

hallieri
Plants described in 1933
Endemic flora of Borneo
Trees of Borneo